TENEX may refer to:

 TENEX (operating system)
 Techsnabexport, a Russian company specializing in export of nuclear materials
 Tenex, a brand name for the medication guanfacine, a sympatholytic used to treat hypertension, ADHD and Anxiety
 Tenex, a brand name for .22 LR ammunition manufactured by Eley Limited and widely used in high level competition such as the ISSF World Cup and Olympic Games
 10X, an alternative name for superfine powdered sugar or confectioner's sugar
 10x, internet slang for "thanks"; see wikt:10x

See also
 TENEX C shell